, better known by the pen name Suihō Tagawa (田河 水泡, Tagawa Suihō), was a Japanese manga artist.

Biography
Born in Sumida, Tokyo, Nakatarō Takamizawa grew up an orphan: his mother died upon his birth, his father and his uncle (who served as one of his stepparents) both died several years afterwards. He graduated from Fukagawa's municipal Rinkai Jinjō elementary school in 1911. In 1919, he was conscripted into the Imperial Japanese Army,  serving in Korea and Manchuria, and left in 1922. In 1925, he graduated from Nihon Bijutsu Gakkō ("Japan School of Art"); during his time at the school, he participated in the radical avant-garde movement Mavo, under the pen name Takamizawa Michinao . 

In 1926, he became a rakugo author. He began producing manga in 1927. He gained a regular assignment selling manga stories and adopted the pen name , which was later corrupted into :  literally means "water bubble". In 1928 he married  (younger sister of Hideo Kobayashi) in a church ceremony.

In 1931, he began the long-running series Norakuro in Kodansha's anthology magazine Shōnen Kurabu, about an anthropomorphic black and white dog in an army of dogs. Although at first intended to have only a brief lifespan, its immense popularity urged Tagawa to continue producing the strip. He has won numerous awards and is recognized as one of the pioneers of the Japanese manga industry.

After World War II he became a bona fide Christian; he credited the faith in helping him overcome alcoholism after several failed attempts. In 1988, he produced the autobiographical Watashi no Rirekisho ("My Résumé") for the Japanese Sankei Shimbun newspaper. He died in 1989 at the age of 90.

References

External links
Biography of Suihō Tagawa 
Biography of Suihō Tagawa (in English)

1899 births
1989 deaths
People from Tokyo
Manga artists from Tokyo
Japanese Christians
Recipients of the Medal with Purple Ribbon
Recipients of the Order of the Rising Sun, 4th class
Imperial Japanese Army personnel